Megaschizomus is a genus of hubbardiid short-tailed whipscorpions, first described by Reginald Frederick Lawrence in 1969.

Species 
, the World Schizomida Catalog accepts the following two species:

 Megaschizomus mossambicus (Lawrence, 1958) – Mozambique
 Megaschizomus zuluanus (Lawrence, 1947) – South Africa

References 

Schizomida genera